Marie-Charlotte Léger (born 13 March 1996) is a French women's footballer who plays for Guingamp in the Division 1 Féminine and France national team.

Career

International career
Marie-Charlotte Léger has represented France at youth levels since 2012. She made her international debut on 19 September 2015 in a friendly match against Brazil as a substitute in the 92nd minute.

Honours
Hénin-Beaumont
 Division 2 Féminine Winner: 2013

References

External links 
 Marie-Charlotte Léger at statsfootfeminine.fr
 
 
 

1996 births
Living people
Sportspeople from Abbeville
French women's footballers
France women's youth international footballers
France women's international footballers
Montpellier HSC (women) players
FC Metz (women) players
Division 1 Féminine players
Women's association football forwards
FC Fleury 91 (women) players
ASJ Soyaux-Charente players
Footballers from Hauts-de-France
FCF Hénin-Beaumont players